Busan Bank (hangul:부산은행, hanja:釜山銀行) is a regional bank in South Korea. The company was established in 1967 to facilitate the regional economy. The bank is based and headquartered in the busy port city of Busan, South Korea, and offers a full range of retail banking services including foreign exchange at its Seomyeon main branch.  The bank has 229 branches in Korea. Its main shareholders include Aberdeen Asset Management Asia Ltd., Lotte group, National Pension Service, Capital Research & Global Investors, Parkland, Templeton, etc.

History 

 October 1967: Established
 June 1972: Listed on the stock exchange
 June 1982: Headquarters relocated to Beomil-Dong, Dong-Gu, Busan
 June 1997: Bu-eun Seonmul (BNK Securities) established
 November 2000: Became a municipal bank
 January 2009: Busan Bank CI changed, so "Pusan Bank" became "Busan Bank"
 March 2011: BS Financial Group (currently BNK Financial Group) launched
 October 2014: Headquarters relocated to Munhyeon-Dong, Nam-Gu, Busan
 March 2015: BNK Busan Bank CI changed
 April 2020: Busan local currency membership program launched (Busan BC Checkcard)

Branches

Domestic Branches 
Number of Branches and Sales Offices: 229

International Branches 
China - Qingdao Branch, Nanjing Branch

Vietnam - Ho Chi Minh Branch, Hanoi Office

Myanmar - Yangon Office

India - Mumbai Office

Card Services 
Busan Bank is a member of the BC Card Network. If you have used more than 2.4 million won per year regardless of product category, the annual fee for the following year is waived. A check card issuance fee of 1,000 KRW is charged, and no fee is charged for reissuance due to renewal or damage, but there is no cash back system like Daegu Bank. However, when a new product is released, an event is held in which the issuance fee is waived as a promotion, and the SUM bank BC Master Check Card launched in February 2020 does not charge an issuance fee at all. Check cards only handle China UnionPay, BC Global, and MasterCard, and MasterCard was first launched in February 2018. BC Global Check Card does not provide any credit overseas, and can only be used at ATMs. High Check Global Card has Maestro, which is a check card network of MasterCard. Also, you can connect your Busan Bank account as a payment account for Lotte Card and other credit card companies.

There used to be an annual fee of 1,000 KRW for the High Check Global Card(Maestro), which can only be used as a check card abroad, but the card is now discontinued.

You could originally only get check cards at a physical branch, but after the establishment of smart ATMs, applications can be made at smart ATMs as well. Only some debit cards can be applied for through internet/mobile banking, and branch pick-up options are only available when applying through PC internet banking. Reissuance is possible only at a branch or a smart ATM.

In 2016, Busan Bank promoted a partnership with Lotte Card. A SUM bank affiliated Lotte Card (credit/check card) was released at the launch of SUM bank, and applications could only be applied through the SUM bank app, but all SUM bank affiliated Lotte Cards were discontinued on March 1, 2020. On February 24, 2020, SUM bank BC Master credit/check card was released, and unlike SUM bank Lotte Card, it is possible to apply for it through Busan Bank internet banking and the banking app, and it can be connected to the customer's Busan Bank account in addition to the SUM bank mobile bank book.

Credit/Check Card Types 

 BC Card (currently available)
 BC (Domestic use only), BC Visa Card (Credit), MasterCard (Other than BNK Friends and SUM bank BC, all cards are issued as credit cards), JCB, China UnionPay, BC Global

Bank President History 

 Sim Hun (2000~2006)
 Lee Jangho (2006~2012)
 Sung Sehwan (2012~2017)
 Bin Daein (2017~2021)
 Ahn Kam-Chan (2021~)

Special Features 
Lotte Group owns 13.6% of the BNK Financial Group's stake and is in partnership with Lotte PS Net. Customers can use Lotte ATMs installed nationwide at 7-Eleven, Lotte Mart, Lotte Department Stores by paying only Busan Bank's commission.

After BS Financial Group took over Kyongnam Bank in October 2014, Kyongnam Bank can also be used at Lotte ATMs located at South Gyeongsang Province and Ulsan Metropolitan City starting from January 18, 2016.

Busan Bank launched fintech mobile non-face-to-face financial service, SUM bank, a joint venture with Lotte Group. SUM bank mobile bank book can only be signed up using SUM bank app. SUM bank used to only provide affiliated Lotte Cards, but it added BC Cards in February 2020. The existing SUM bank Lotte Cards were discontinued on March 1, 2020. There is no issuance fee for the SUM bank affiliated BC Check Card.

In 2016, Busan Bank introduced a smart ATM.

Foreign Exchange 
Customers signed up for Busan Bank Internet Banking can exchange currencies listed below:

  dollar
  yen
  euro
  yuan

When exchanging currencies other than the ones listed above, you have to call the Busan Bank branch you will be visiting to check if they have the currency you need in hand.

When receiving the currency you applied for, you can visit the branch you selected when you applied for it, during the office hours. Busan Port Passenger Terminal branch and Gimhae International Airport branch are open all year round.

Currency exchange ATMs are also available at Busan Port Passenger Terminal branch (JPY) and Gimhae International Airport branch (USD/JPY) all year round, but limited to USD and JPY.

See also

List of Banks in South Korea
Air Busan - Busan Bank helper and investors

References

External links
 

Banks of South Korea
Companies based in Busan
Banks established in 1967